No. 275 Squadron RAF was a Royal Air Force air-sea rescue squadron that served between 1941 and 1959.

History
No. 275 Squadron RAF was formed at RAF Valley on 15 October 1941 for air-sea rescue duties in the Irish sea and was 9 Group's Air Sea Rescue Unit.

Following the Squadron's formation the first aircraft to be operated were Lysanders Mk.IIIa's. Later in the year Walruses were added to the Squadron followed by Defiants, Spitfires and Ansons.

Part of the Squadron's operation saw a detachment based at RAF Andreas. The detachment's Walrus amphibian Mk.I's were often to be seen flying around the Isle of Man in addition to which Blackburn Skuas were also operated. 
 
In April 1944 the Squadron moved to RAF Warmwell to cover the sea area between England and Normandy. Air-sea rescue missions continued until 15 February 1945 when the Squadron was disbanded at RAF Harrowbeer.

No. 275 squadron was reformed at RAF Linton-on-Ouse as a sea and rescue Squadron to provide cover over the North Sea in March 1953 equipped with Sycamore HR.13 and HR.14 Helicopters, later relocating to RAF Thornaby on 18 November 1954 and remaining at Thornaby until October 1957 when the Squadron moved to RAF Leconfield. In March 1959 the unit converted to the Whirlwind HAR.4 helicopter, but on 1 September 1959 the Squadron was renumbered to No. 228 Squadron RAF and No. 275 ceased to exist.

Aircraft operated

Squadron bases

Notes

References

External links
 squadron histories Nos. 271-275 Squadrons

Aircraft squadrons of the Royal Air Force in World War II
275 Squadron
Rescue aviation units and formations
Military units and formations established in 1941
Military units and formations disestablished in 1959